Notebook on Cities and Clothes is a documentary film about Yohji Yamamoto directed by Wim Wenders. Despite Wender's previous disdain for fashion, he undertook filming after being commissioned by the Pompidou Center in Paris. The film loosely centers on a series of interviews with Yamamoto, inter-spaced with footage of his atelier, previous work and his then upcoming show. Notably, Yamamoto's comments and philosophical musings lead Wenders to make his own comments about the nature of cities, identity, and the role of cinema in modern life.

Cast 
 Yohji Yamamoto as himself

References

External links 
 

Films directed by Wim Wenders
1989 documentary films
1989 films
Documentary films about fashion designers
Films scored by Laurent Petitgand
German documentary films
French documentary films
1980s French films
1980s German films